The 1977 Fort Lauderdale Strikers season was the first season of the new team, and the club's eleventh season in professional soccer.  It is also the first ever incarnation of the club's new name.  Previously they were known as the Miami Toros.  The 1977 squad won the North American Soccer League's Eastern Division of the Atlantic Conference, and was the top team in regular season with 19 victories for 161 points.

Background

First ever match
The Strikers first-ever game was a preseason indoor match played on February 27, 1977 at the Bayfront Center in St. Petersburg, Florida, against the Tampa Bay Rowdies. Though only an exhibition, this was the first meeting in what was to become one of the most enduring rivalries in North American soccer, the Florida Derby. It would also set the tone for many years of indoor frustration for the Strikers as they fell, 9–8, to the hosts.

Match report

Review

Competitions

Friendlies

NASL regular season
W = Wins, L = Losses, GF = Goals For, GA = Goals Against, BP = Bonus Points, Pts= point system

6 points for a win, 0 points for a loss, 1 point for each regulation goal scored up to three per game.

Atlantic Conference

Results summaries

Results by round

Match reports

NASL Playoffs

Divisional Championships

Bracket

Match reports

Statistics

Transfers

See also
1977 Fort Lauderdale Strikers

References 

1977
Fort Lauderdale Strikers
Fort Lauderdale Strikers
Fort Lauderdale